Lexington Market station is a Light RailLink station adjacent to Lexington Market in Baltimore, Maryland. The station has two side platforms on the sidewalks of Howard Street. Lexington Market station on the Metro SubwayLink is one block to the west.

References

External links

 Northbound Light Rail Station from Google Maps Street View
 Southbound Light Rail Station from Google Maps Street View

Baltimore Light Rail stations
Downtown Baltimore
Railway stations in Baltimore